Drenta Bluff is the ice-covered bluff of elevation 1043 m forming the south extremity of Louis-Philippe Plateau on Trinity Peninsula in Graham Land, Antarctica.  It is situated on the north side of Benz Pass, surmounting Verdikal Gap to the west and Cugnot Ice Piedmont to the east-northeast.

The bluff is named after the settlement of Drenta in Northern Bulgaria.

Location
German-British mapping in 1996.

Maps
 Trinity Peninsula. Scale 1:250000 topographic map No. 5697. Institut für Angewandte Geodäsie and British Antarctic Survey, 1996.
 Antarctic Digital Database (ADD). Scale 1:250000 topographic map of Antarctica. Scientific Committee on Antarctic Research (SCAR). Since 1993, regularly updated.

Notes

References
 Drenta Bluff. SCAR Composite Antarctic Gazetteer
 Bulgarian Antarctic Gazetteer. Antarctic Place-names Commission. (details in Bulgarian, basic data in English)

External links
 Drenta Bluff. Copernix satellite image

Cliffs of Graham Land
Landforms of Trinity Peninsula
Bulgaria and the Antarctic